The 2010 Brazilian gubernatorial elections were held on Sunday, October 3, as part of the country's general election. In these elections, all 26 Brazilian states and the Federal District governorships were up for election. When none of the candidates received more than a half of the valid votes in a given state, a run-off was held on October 24, 2010 between the two candidates with the most votes. According to the Federal Constitution, Governors are elected directly to a four-year term, with a limit of two terms. Eleven governors were prohibited from seeking re-election.

Before election, ten of the total seats were held by the Brazilian Democratic Movement Party (PMDB), followed by five held by the Workers' Party (PT) and the Brazilian Social Democracy Party (PSDB) each. The Brazilian Socialist Party (PSB) holds three seats, and the Progressive Party (PP) holds two. The Democratic Labour Party (PDT) and the Republic Party (PR) holds one seat each. Some Governors are not the same from the outcome of the previous election, since some of them had their terms repealed by the Superior Electoral Court.

These elections coincided with the presidential election, as well as the elections for Legislative Assemblies and both houses of the National Congress. These were the 8th direct gubernatorial elections, and the sixth since the end of the military dictatorship.

Elections by state
Candidacies registered under the Superior Electoral Court website:

Retired governors
Eleven incumbent Governors – Aécio Neves (Minas Gerais), Alcides Rodrigues (Goiás), Blairo Maggi (Mato Grosso), Eduardo Braga (Amazonas), Ivo Cassol (Rondônia), Luiz Henrique da Silveira (Santa Catarina), Paulo Hartung (Espírito Santo), Roberto Requião (Paraná), Waldez Góes (Amapá), Wilma de Faria (Rio Grande do Norte) and Wellington Dias (Piauí) – were all elected in 2002 and re-elected in 2006 and thus are not constitutionally allowed to run for their seats again.

After his involvement in a corruption scandal in late 2009 and subsequent defection from the Democrats (DEM), Federal District Governor José Roberto Arruda also became ineligible, since it is required for citizens seeking to run for any public office in the country to be a registered party member for at least one year before the predicted election date. Soon after, Arruda became the first Brazilian Governor to be arrested while still in office, on February 11, 2010. His Vice Governor, Paulo Octávio took office but resigned twelve days later. The current Governor of the Federal District is Rogério Rosso, from the Brazilian Democratic Movement Party (PMDB), indirectly elected by the local chamber after the corruption scandal. Rosso refrained from seeking a second term, as did Binho Marques, Governor of Acre.

References

2010 elections in Brazil
Gubernatorial elections in Brazil
October 2010 events in South America